Trilby Clark (born Gwendolyn Gladys Blakely Clark; 30 August 1896 – 7 July 1983) was an Australian actress who appeared in British films beginning in the silent film era. She was a leading lady in British films during the 1920s and early 1930s.

Trilby Clark was born in Adelaide, Australia, and died in London in 1983.

Partial filmography

 The Breaking of the Drought (1920)
 Big Dan (1923)
 Hoodman Blind (1923)
 The Lover of Camille (1924)
 Just Off Broadway (1924)
 Silent Sanderson (1925)
 The Bad Lands (1925)
 The Prairie Pirate (1925)
 The Seventh Bandit (1925)
 Satan Town (1926)
 Carry On (1927)
 In the First Degree (1927)
 Maria Marten (1928)
 The Passing of Mr. Quin (1928)
 Chick (1928)
 God's Clay (1928)
 The Devil's Maze (1929)
 The Compulsory Husband (1930)
 Harmony Heaven (1930)
 The Squeaker (1930)
 The Night Porter (1930)

See also
 W. H. Clark (brewer) – Family

References

External links

1896 births
1983 deaths
Actresses from Adelaide
Australian film actresses
Australian silent film actresses
20th-century Australian actresses
Australian expatriate actresses in the United Kingdom